Vitali Vladimirovich Dubina (born 11 May 1980) is a former pair skater who competed for both Ukraine and Russia.

Career
Early in his career, Dubina competed with Anna Adashkevich on the junior level. They placed 13th at the 1996 World Junior Figure Skating Championships. Following that partnership, he teamed up with Elena Kokhanevich, with whom he placed 12th at the 1998 World Junior Figure Skating Championships. He then teamed up with Anna Kaverzina and began competing for Russia. They won the bronze medal at the 1998–1999 ISU Junior Grand Prix event in China and placed 8th at the 1999 Russian Figure Skating Championships.

In 1999, Dubina teamed up with Victoria Maxiuta. They originally competed for Russia and placed 6th at the 2000 Russian Figure Skating Championships. They then changed countries to Ukraine. They won the silver medals at the 2001 and 2002 Ukrainian Figure Skating Championships. That partnership ended in 2002.

Dubina briefly teamed up with Anastasia Ignatieva, representing Russia. They competed in national-level competitions in Russia and competed at the 2005 Nebelhorn Trophy, representing Russia. They withdrew from the competition after the short program.

Programs
(with Victoria Maxiuta)

Competitive highlights

With Ignatieva for Russia

With Maxiuta for Ukraine and Russia

With Kaverzina for Russia

With Kokhanevich for Ukraine

With Adashkevich for Ukraine

References

 2005 Nebelhorn Trophy
 1998–1999 ISU Junior Grand Prix
 1997-1998 ISU Junior Series

External links 
 
 Vitali Dubina (in Russian)

Russian male pair skaters
Ukrainian male pair skaters
1980 births
Sportspeople from Odesa
Living people